The women's discus throw event at the 1955 International University Sports Week was held in San Sebastián on 11 August 1955.

Results

References

Athletics at the 1955 Summer International University Sports Week
1955